Bartholomew Ikechukwu Ibenegbu (born February 22, 1986), nicknamed Mosquito, is a Nigerian attacking midfielder who plays for Enugu Rangers.

Career
Before Heartland, he played for Enyimba F.C. and El-Kanemi Warriors, where he led the Nigerian Premier League in scoring in 2006 with ten goals.

International career
Ibenegbu has played on the Nigeria national beach soccer team since 2006. He was called into the 2007 Under-23 camp before the Beijing Olympics but did not make the final team. He was called into camp for the senior team ahead of the 2010 African Cup of Nations, one of only three home-based players to make it.
He made his debut as a substitute in the January 2012 friendly vs Angola.

References

External links
Ike Ibenegbu at Footballdatabase

1986 births
Living people
Nigerian footballers
Association football midfielders
Enyimba F.C. players
Heartland F.C. players
El-Kanemi Warriors F.C. players
Warri Wolves F.C. players
Rangers International F.C. players
Sportspeople from Lagos
Nigeria Professional Football League players
Nigeria A' international footballers
2016 African Nations Championship players